The 56 series is a series of cargo ships built by Mitsui Engineering & Shipbuilding.

, 151 ships have been built and 170 ordered. The 151st was delivered to New Blossom Maritime S.A. They are built at Mitsui's Tamano and Chiba shipyards.

Design
The ships are bulk carriers, 189.99m long overall (182m between perpendiculars) with 56,000 dwt and approximately 31000gt. Hold volume is over 70,000m³, divided between five cargo holds with four cranes. Main engines are generally MAN B&W 6S50MC-C low-speed diesels. Service speed is 14.5 knots.

References

Cargo ships
Ships built by Mitsui Engineering and Shipbuilding